Jinshan Railway or Jinshan Line is a commuter railway line in Shanghai, part of the planned Shanghai Metropolitan Area Intercity Railway. Passengers can transfer to Lines 1, 3, 5 and 15. Originally built in 1975 as a suburban branch, it has since been upgraded into a high-speed commuter rail line which opened on 28 September 2012. The line was branded as Line 22 before opening. However, there is another line in long-term planning called Line 22, see Line 22 (Shanghai Metro).

The Shanghai-Jinshan line is the first local rail system that supports the public transportation card.

At first, the daily passenger flow was just 13,000 people a day, in 2019 has increased to 33,000. More than 60 million people have traveled on the line in the first seven years of operation.

Stations

Service routes
 Trains stop at stations marked "●" and pass those marked "｜".
 Holiday service schedule is different from regular service. Holiday service is available in weekends, and national holidays.

Station demolished
 Sanyang Station: Between Jinshan Industrial Park and Jinshanwei
 Jinshanwei East Station: After Jinshanwei

Future expansion

Extension to Shanghai Hongqiao
In February 2021, it was stated that a project to increase the capacity of the line would start before the end of the year, and the possibility of services running to Shanghai Hongqiao railway station was being explored.

Extension from Shanghai South Railway station
A branch line to Sanlin South on the Airport Link line is in the planning. Another branch line to Shanghai Stadium has been planned.

Southern extension:  Jinshan-Pinghu City Railway

There are also plans to extend the line west to Haiyan County via Pinghu.
The Jinshan-Pinghu municipal railway is a commuter-oriented, public-transit railway that uses national trunk lines, national-Shanghai joint-venture railway trunks, and municipal railways to share resources. It plans to maintain the technical standards, transportation organization, and operation management model of Jinshan Railway. The total investment of the project is estimated to be about 17.089 billion yuan. There are 8 stations, including 1 connection station. Including the renovation project of Jinshanwei railway station, and 1 EMU.

It is expected that the project can be completed from the end of 2023 to the first half of 2024. After the expansion project is completed, Jinshan Railway will expand from the existing 37 pairs to about 60 pairs, which can be further enlarged according to demand.

Technology

Rolling Stock
Jinshan Railway passenger trains include:
 3 CRH2A EMU trains (are also used on other long-distance lines)
 2 CRH6A EMU trains (dedicated trains for Jinshan)
 4 CRH6F EMU trains (dedicated trains for Jinshan); trains with a larger passenger capacity of 1,950. Started operating from 13 December 2019. The previous model could only take about 600 passengers.

See also 
 Shanghai Rail Transit

References

Rail transport in Shanghai
Shanghai Metro
Railway lines opened in 1975
25 kV AC railway electrification